The Pepsi Bottling Group, Inc. was the world's largest bottler of Pepsi-Cola beverages. PBG sales of Pepsi-Cola beverages accounted for more than one-half of the Pepsi-Cola beverages sold in the United States and Canada and about 40 percent worldwide. PBG had the exclusive right to manufacture, sell and distribute Pepsi-Cola beverages in all or a portion of 43 states, the District of Columbia, nine Canadian provinces, Spain, Greece, Russia, Turkey and Mexico. Approximately 70 percent of PBG's volume was sold in the United States and Canada. Pepsi Bottling Group was based in Somers, New York.

On August 4, 2009, The Pepsi Bottling Group and another major Pepsi bottler, PepsiAmericas, were purchased by PepsiCo, headquartered in Purchase, New York. The purchases were completed on February 26, 2010, forming a wholly owned PepsiCo subsidiary, the Pepsi Beverages Company (PBC).

History

On September 30, 2008, The Pepsi Bottling Group Inc. said that third-quarter earnings fell to $231 million, or $1.06 a share, compared to $260 million, or $1.12 a share, in the same period a year ago. The year-ago period included a 14-cent-a-share gain due to a tax benefit and restructuring charges. Revenue rose 2% to $3.8 billion. Eric Foss, chief executive officer, said that soft consumer demand in the US had spread during the third quarter "across geographies" leading to sales volume declines in Europe and Mexico. In Europe, total volume of cases sold fell 6 per cent. He cited economic factors ranging from economic volatility and the impact of food inflation in Russia, to the effects of the housing slump in Spain. In Mexico, where case volumes were down 9 per cent, he noted that cash remittances from the US had fallen to their lowest level in over a decade, leading to declines in consumer confidence.

On October 6, 2008, Eric Foss was promoted to chairman of the board.

On October 14, 2008, PepsiCo Inc. announced that it would be cutting jobs and closing factories to give it some "breathing room" to navigate the volatility that has permeated all corners of the global economy. The maker of Pepsi-Cola, Doritos and Sun Chips said it planned to eliminate 3,300 jobs and shutter six plants in an effort to save $1.2 billion over three years. It plans to use the savings primarily to revive lagging U.S. soft drink sales.

On November 19, 2008, The Pepsi Bottling Group announced it was cutting costs as part of a multiyear restructuring program to improve efficiencies in its global operations. Under its "Structured to Succeed" program, 3,150 employees, or 4.5% of its workers, would lose their jobs. About 750 jobs were expected to be cut in Pepsi Bottling's U.S. and Canada operations, including the closure of four facilities in the U.S. In Europe, operation streamlining would impact 200 jobs, while in Mexico, the closure of three plants, 30 distribution centers and 700 routes would impact 2,200 jobs.

On February 10, 2009, The Pepsi Bottling Group Inc. reported a net loss of $271 million in the fourth quarter and projected 2009 earnings below analysts' expectations. This includes a net after-tax charge of $336 million, due to restructuring, and a non-cash asset impairment charge related primarily to PBG's business in Mexico. Volume fell 7 percent in North America and 6 percent in Europe.

On February 19, 2009, PepsiCo announced a multiyear distribution agreement with Rockstar Energy Drink. Rockstar will be distributed by The Pepsi Bottling Group, PepsiAmericas, Pepsi Bottling Ventures and other independent Pepsi-Cola bottlers in most of the United States and all of Canada.

Management
 Eric J. Foss, chairman and chief executive officer (2008 Forbes ranked #265 for executive pay: $1,730,000)
 President, PBG North America
 Richard Glover, president, PBG Canada
 Yiannis Petrides, president, PBG Europe  
 Brent J. Franks, senior vice president, worldwide operations  
 Eric Llopis, senior vice president, chief strategy officer 
 Ronald R.R. Neugold, vice president, foodservice
 Tom Lardieri, vice president and controller   
 Mary Winn Settino, vice president, investor and public relations

References

Further reading 
USA Today Q&A with CEO Eric Foss, USA Today, April 20, 2008

External links

Companies based in Westchester County, New York
PepsiCo bottlers
Drink companies of the United States
Food and drink companies established in 1999
1999 establishments in New York (state)